Harald  Karger (born 14 October 1956 in Weilburg) is a former German footballer.

Player career
Karger moved from amateur club FC Burgsolms to the Bundesliga side Eintracht Frankfurt in 1979. The qualified mail man scored nine goals in 23 appearances in his first season. In the UEFA cup Karger netted as well for his club and he scored in the first leg of the 1980 UEFA Cup Final against Borussia Mönchengladbach.
The rising star suffered a collateral ligament damage in this match, which meant he missed the second leg. He only made a handful of further Bundesliga appearances after this injury. He was on the bench when Frankfurt won the 1981 DFB-Pokal Final the following season.

Because of his heading strength, Karger was awarded the nickname Schädel-Harry (Skull Harry) by journalists.

Manager career
After initial tenures at some local amateur clubs, Karger is one of twenty youth coaches in the football academy of Eintracht Frankfurt and works together with former Eintracht players like Charly Körbel, Ralf Weber and Norbert Nachtweih.

References

1956 births
Living people
People from Weilburg
Sportspeople from Giessen (region)
German footballers
Eintracht Frankfurt players
Eintracht Frankfurt non-playing staff
Bundesliga players
Association football forwards
UEFA Cup winning players
Footballers from Hesse
20th-century German people
West German footballers